Sona Bolagh (also Romanized as Sonā Bolāgh; also known as Şūnābolāghī) is a village in Baba Jik Rural District, in the Central District of Chaldoran County, West Azerbaijan Province, Iran. At the 2006 census, its population was 86, in 27 families.

References 

Populated places in Chaldoran County